The Royal College of Pathologists (RCPath) is a professional membership organisation.
Its main function is the overseeing of postgraduate training, and its Fellowship Examination (FRCPath) is recognised as the standard assessment of fitness to practise in this branch of medicine.

Constitution
The Royal College of Pathologists is a professional membership organisation, to maintain the standards and reputation of British pathology, through training, assessments, examinations and professional development. It is a registered charity and is not a trades union. Its 11,000 members work in hospital laboratories, universities and industry worldwide.

History
The College of Pathologists was founded in 1962, to optimise postgraduate training in the relatively young science of pathology, with its high importance in the diagnostic process, and the increasing range of specialist studies within it. The college received its royal charter in 1970 and its Patron is Her Majesty Queen Elizabeth II.

Training and examinations
The Fellowship Examination of the Royal College of Pathologists (FRCPath) is the main method of assessment for UK pathology training  -  evaluation of a candidate's training programme, indicating fitness to practise, whilst also marking the entry into independent practice and the beginning of continuing professional development. Upon successful completion, trainees are awarded Fellowship status of the Royal College of Pathologists.

Fellowship may also be awarded on the basis of submitted published works, though this does not contribute to the award of the Certificate of Completion of Training and is not a mark of eligibility for appointment to a Consultant post or unsupervised practice.

The college runs a national scheme for overseeing of continued education of pathologists in clinical practice, as well as sponsoring workshops, lectures and courses.

Disciplines
The following are disciplines of pathology which the college oversees:
 Histopathology
 Neuropathology
 Cytopathology
 Paediatric pathology
 Forensic Pathology
 Clinical Biochemistry, sometimes called Chemical Pathology
 Haematology (with the Royal College of Physicians)
 Immunology (with the Royal College of Physicians)
 The work of coroners
 Medical Microbiology (with the Royal College of Physicians, as Combined Infection Training)
 Virology (with the Royal College of Physicians, as Combined Infection Training)
 Veterinary Pathology
 Genetics (both Clinical Cytogenetics and Molecular Genetics)
 Oral and Maxillofacial Pathology
 Toxicology
 Clinical Embryology

Publications
The Royal College of Pathologists produces The Bulletin of The Royal College of Pathologists, a quarterly professional membership magazine.

Presidents
 Professor Michael Osborn 2020–
 Professor Joanne Martin 2017–2020
 Dr Suzannah Lishman 2014–2017
 Dr Archie Prentice 2011–2014
 Professor Peter Furness 2008–2011
 Professor Adrian Newland CBE 2005–2008
 Professor Sir James Underwood 2002–2005
 Professor Sir John Lilleyman 1999–2002
 Professor Sir Roderick MacSween 1996–1999
 Professor Alastair Bellingham CBE 1993–1996
 Professor Sir Peter Lachmann 1990–1993
 Professor Sir Dillwyn Williams 1987–1990
 Professor Dame Barbara Clayton 1984–1987
 Professor Robert Curran 1981–1984
 Professor John Anderson CBE 1978–1981
 Sir Robert Williams 1975–1978
 Sir John Dacie 1972–1975
 Sir Theo Crawford 1969–1972
 Sir James Howie 1966–1969
 Sir Roy Cameron 1962–1966

Arms

References

External links 
 

Health in the London Borough of Tower Hamlets
Medical associations based in the United Kingdom
College of Pathologists
Pathology organizations
Pathologists
1962 establishments in the United Kingdom
Pathologists
Scientific organizations established in 1962